Alassane Alexandre Pléa (born 10 March 1993) is a French professional footballer who plays as a striker or winger for Bundesliga club Borussia Mönchengladbach and the France national team.

Club career

Lyon

Pléa made his senior debut for Lyon on 7 October 2012 in an away Ligue 1 match against Lorient, coming on as a substitute for Bafétimbi Gomis in the 90th minute; the match ended in a 1–1 draw.

Nice
Pléa left Lyon and joined Nice in the summer of 2014 in search of more game time in a deal worth £450,000. Under his first manager at Nice, Claude Puel, he was moved into the middle of the park and began to flourish first under Puel and then even more so under his successor Lucien Favre.

On 20 October 2016, Pléa scored the only goal in the 1–0 away victory against Red Bull Salzburg in the 2016–17 UEFA Europa League Group I match. That was Nice's first-ever UEFA club competition away win, having previously gone 15 UEFA club competition away matches without a win. 3 days later, he scored a hat-trick in a Ligue 1 match as leaders Nice won 4–2 at Metz to maintain their advantage at the top of the table at four points.

On 20 February 2017, Pléa underwent arthroscopy of the right knee in Lyon, which would likely put him out of action for five months. Eight days earlier, he had injured his right knee during the first half of a Ligue 1 match against Rennes and had to be substituted in the 43rd minute. As of 21 February 2017, he was Nice's top Ligue 1 scorer and was 5th in the Ligue 1 top scorers' chart of the 2016–17 season with 11 Ligue 1 goals.

Playing alongside Mario Balotelli, he proved much more than a wingman by notching 27 goals and nine assists across the 2016–17 and 2017–18 Ligue 1 seasons, helping Nice finish as high as third in 2016–17.

Borussia Mönchengladbach

2018–2020
In July 2018, Pléa joined Borussia Mönchengladbach on a five-year contract. The transfer fee paid to Nice was reported as €25 million. He made his debut for the club against BSC Hastedt in the first round of the DFB-Pokal on 19 August 2018 and scored a hat-trick as Gladbach cruised to an 11–1 win. He scored his first Bundesliga goal for the club on 1 September, securing a 1–1 draw away to Augsburg. He finished his debut season as the club's top scorer with 12 league goals and 15 across all competitions.

The following season, Pléa was praised for adding a creative edge to his attacking output, contributing eight goals and seven assists in his first 22 Bundesliga appearances. In the club's match against RB Leipzig on 1 February 2020, Pléa opened the scoring and then got his first two yellow cards of the season and was sent off as Gladbach fell to a 2–2 draw after leading 2–0. On 31 May, he scored his tenth league goal of the season and provided assists for both of Marcus Thuram's goals in a 4–1 victory over 1. FC Union Berlin.

2020–21 season
Pléa scored his first goal of the season in a 3–1 Bundesliga victory over FC Köln on 3 October 2020. On 3 November, Pléa scored a hat-trick in a 6–0 rout of Shakhtar Donetsk away in the group stage of the Champions League. The result was the club's largest victory in competition history. He scored another two Champions League goals in a 2–3 group stage loss against Inter Milan on 1 December 2020; he was denied a hat-trick and a equalizing goal by the video assistant referee in the final minutes of the match.

2021–22 season 
On 13 August 2021, Pléa scored the first goal of the Bundesliga campaign in a 1–1 draw against Bayern Munich.

International career
Born in France, Pléa is of Malian descent. He is a France youth international having represented his nation at under-18, under-19, under-20 and under-21 levels. He played with the under-19 team at the 2012 UEFA European Under-19 Football Championship.

In November 2018, Pléa was called up into the senior team for the first time after the injury-enforced withdrawal of Anthony Martial and Alexandre Lacazette for the games against Netherlands and Uruguay. He made his debut against the latter replacing Olivier Giroud in the 80th minute of a 1–0 home win.

Career statistics

Club

International

References

External links

 
 

1993 births
Living people
Footballers from Lille
French footballers
France youth international footballers
France under-21 international footballers
France international footballers
Association football wingers
Olympique Lyonnais players
AJ Auxerre players
OGC Nice players
Borussia Mönchengladbach players
Ligue 1 players
Ligue 2 players
Bundesliga players
French expatriate footballers
Expatriate footballers in Germany
French expatriate sportspeople in Germany
French sportspeople of Malian descent
Wasquehal Football players
Black French sportspeople